CATU can refer to:

Catu, a city in Brazil
Catu River, a river in Brazil
Ceramic and Allied Trades Union, a former British trade union
Phineas and Ferb the Movie: Candace Against the Universe, a 2020 American animated musical adventure comedy film